Miss December is a 2011 dark romantic comedy directed by Derek Lindeman and written by Faith Brody. Jensen Bucher plays Ari, a waitress who believes she may be the next victim of a serial killer.

Plot
The "Calendar Girl Killer" has been murdering a different girl in Philadelphia every month and sending their photos to the press in pin-up style poses. After a taunting letter to the press describing his future 'Miss December', a waitress named Ari believes he has selected her and finds it flattering rather than horrifying and attempts to figure out who her 'secret admirer' may be.

Production
The story originated as a 2002 one-act play by Brody called Christmas Eve. It was later adapted into the 2006 short film titled Calendar Girl, before being adapted into the feature-length 2012 film, Miss December by Double Windsor Films.

Film festivals

Reception
Aintitcool.com wrote "MISS DECEMBER has a nice black soul and is definitely worth checking out for those in the mood for a little humor in the shade of pitch."

References

External links
 
 

2011 films
American comedy horror films
2010s comedy horror films
SModcast Pictures films
2011 comedy films
2010s American films